The Cabinet of the State of East Indonesia served as the central government apparatus of the State of East Indonesia, headed by a prime minister who were appointed by the head of state. During the three-year lifetime of the state between 24 December 1946 and 27 December 1949, there were eight cabinets in total, headed by six different prime ministers.

First Malewa cabinet (13 January 1947 – 2 June 1947) 

At the Denpasar Conference (18-24 December 1946) organized by Acting Governor-General of the Dutch East Indies Hubertus van Mook, the State of East Indonesia was established with Balinese noble Tjokorda Gde Raka Soekawati was elected head of state designated as president, and Nadjamuddin Daeng Malewa was appointed as prime minister-designate. Following discussions between the two men in Jakarta, the cabinet was announced and inaugurated on 13 January 1947 with the composition as follows:

As the provisional legislature had achieved very little in its first session, a number of its members proposed giving the cabinet unlimited powers to pass laws pending their later approval by the legislature. The cabinet would resign to allow the prime minister a free reign to make new appointments and form a cabinet with majority political support. Nadjamuddin Daeng Malewa held a series of meetings with political supporters and opponents in late May 1947 to decide on the composition of his revised cabinet.

Second Malewa cabinet (2 June 1947 – 11 October 1947) 

The second Nadjamuddin Daeng Malewa cabinet was announced on 31 May 1947. its composition was:

In December 1947, Prime Minister Nadjamuddin Daeng Malewa was charged with corruption while he and president Soekawati were on an overseas visit, ending his term of office and his second cabinet.

Warouw cabinet (11 October 1947 – 15 December 1947) 

The Warouw Cabinet was formed on 10 October 1947 and sworn in the following day. Its composition was:

The politically inexperienced Prime Minister Warouw and his cabinet was accused of being overly supportive of the Dutch military offensive launched against the areas controlled by the Republicans in July 1947 during Operation Product, and was brought down by the Provisional Representative Body.

First Gde Agung cabinet (15 December 1947 – 12 January 1949) 

The first Gde Agung cabinet was sworn in on 15 December 1947. Its composition was as follows:

This was the first cabinet to include supporters of the Indonesian Republic, and on 23 December 1947, it toned down the government's support for the July 1947 Dutch military action. At midnight on 19 December 1948, the Dutch launched another military attack against the Republic of Indonesia, codenamed Operation Kraai, and the First Gde Agung cabinet resigned in protest.

Second Gde Agung cabinet (12 January 1949 – 27 December 1949) 
The second Gde Agung cabinet was formed and sworn in on 12 January 1949. Its composition was as follows:

Following the transfer of sovereignty from the Netherlands to the United States of Indonesia (RUSI) a result of the Dutch–Indonesian Round Table Conference, prime minister Gde Agung was appointed foreign minister in the RUSI cabinet, and submitted his resignation as prime minister of East Indonesia.

Tatengkeng cabinet (27 December 1949 – 14 March 1950) 

The Tatengkeng cabinet was sworn in on 27 December 1949. Its composition was as follows:

Following elections, the provisional legislature was disbanded on 20 February 1950, and the cabinet also resigned. The following day, the elected representatives took their seats, while the Justice minister Chris Soumokil subsequently fled to Ambon and proclaimed the establishment of the Republic of South Maluku (RMS).

Diapari cabinet (14 March 1950 – 10 May 1950) 

The Diapari cabinet was sworn in on 14 March 1950 in the middle of the RMS Crisis. Its composition was as follows:

Since the elected parliament convened, it had been sharply divided between federalists, who supported the government of East Indonesia and the concept of the federal United States of Indonesia, and the opposition unitarians, who wanted a return to a unitary Indonesian republic. The two main federalist factions repeatedly called for the government to dismantle the State of East Indonesia, and subsequently one of the factions supporting the government called for the cabinet to resign and be replaced by one that was more broadly representative of the legislature. The motion was passed on 25 April, and the cabinet resigned. They remained in office as caretaker government until a new government could be formed.

On 2 May 1950, Prime Minister Diapari and several members of the cabinet, as well as some members of the Provisional Representative Body, were arrested and charged with conspiracy for being involved with Makassar Uprising involving Capt. Andi Aziz. None of them were charged any further and released from detention, as their involvement could not be proven.

Putuhena cabinet (10 May 1950 – 16 August 1950) 

The pro-republican Putuhena (or Poetoehena in older spelling) cabinet was tasked with making preparations for the integration of East Indonesia into a unitary Republic of Indonesia. Unlike previous prime ministers who were politicians of within East Indonesia, Martinus Putuhena was an Ambon-born federal official who were later posted in Makassar, serving as the civilian chair of the Territorial Military Commission. He was asked by president Soekawati to form a government after prime minister-designate Eliza Urbanus Pupella failed to form a government, all while the Diapari caretaker government were brought to halt.

Its composition was as follows:

On 19 May 1950, following negotiations between the United States of Indonesia (representing the State of East Indonesia and the State of East Sumatra) and the Republic of Indonesia, an agreement was reached to establish a unitary Indonesian state. This state was formed on 15 August 1950, and given that this meant the State of East Indonesia no longer existed, Putuhena and his cabinet resigned on 16 August.

See also 

United States of Indonesia
Indonesian National Revolution

Notes

References 

 
 
 
 

History of Indonesia
States and territories established in 1946
State of East Indonesia